Yuri Mikhailovich Baturenko (born 29 December 1964) is a Tajikistani professional football coach and a former player. He is an assistant manager with FC Istiklol.

Playing career
He made his professional debut in the Soviet First League in 1983 for FC Pamir Dushanbe.

Coaching career
On 20 March 2021, he was appointed manager of FC Rotor Volgograd. At the end of the season, Rotor was relegated from the Russian Premier League and Baturenko left the club on 26 May 2021.

Honours
 Russian Premier League runner-up: 1995.
 Russian Premier League bronze: 1994.
 Russian Cup winner: 1996 (played in the early stages of the 1995–96 tournament for FC Lokomotiv Moscow).

References

External links

1964 births
Sportspeople from Dushanbe
Living people
Soviet footballers
Tajikistani footballers
Tajikistani expatriate footballers
Tajikistan international footballers
Tajikistani football managers
CSKA Pamir Dushanbe players
PFC CSKA Moscow players
FC Lokomotiv Moscow players
FC Tyumen players
FC Sokol Saratov players
FC Rotor Volgograd managers
Expatriate footballers in Russia
Soviet Top League players
Russian Premier League players
Tajikistani people of Ukrainian descent
Association football midfielders
Russian Premier League managers